Flat Time House was the studio home of British conceptual artist John Latham (1921–2006) and is now open as a contemporary art gallery, centre for alternative learning and artist residency space, housing the John Latham archive. It is located on Bellenden Road, South London, England. It is a registered charity under English law.

Recent Exhibitions
 Ants and Grasshoppers: reflections on the anxious object – Pavel Büchler, John Cage, Eva Koťátková, John Latham, Sarah Lucas. Curated by David Thorp
 The Bard – William Blake
 Formative Years On Dearth – Sung Tieu
 the billion year spree – Annika Kahrs
 The Psychopathic Now – Jeff Nuttall and Bomb Culture
 Passive Imperative Participation Vibe – Ben Cain
 State 0 – Lina Hermsdorf
 Tears Shared – Marc Camille Chaimowicz with Bruno Pelassy
 Solidarity Avenue – Edward Krasiński
 Palindromes – Barry Flanagan and John Latham

Residencies
 N-U graduate residency – Past residents include Fiona Marron, Rose Parish
 State 0 research residency – Past residents include Katherine Jackson and Sophia Satchell Baeza
 Phynance Residency – Past residents include Alex Frost, Simon and Tom Bloor
 Stuart Whipps – in residence 2012
 Laure Prouvost – in residence 2010

Funding
Flat Time House is publicly funded by Arts Council England and via grant by the John Latham Foundation. Additional financial support for the programme comes from trusts and foundations including the estate of Barry Flanagan, the Henry Moore Foundation, the Danish Arts Council, University College London, Arts and Humanities Research Council, Lisson Gallery and Arts Catalyst.

See also
 South London Gallery
 Peckham Platform
 Raven Row

References

External links
 Official website
 John Latham archive

Arts centres in London
Contemporary art galleries in London
Buildings and structures in the London Borough of Southwark
Tourist attractions in the London Borough of Southwark
Art galleries established in 2008
Peckham
2008 establishments in England
2008 establishments in the United Kingdom
Charities based in England